ETA Star Group is an investment company headquartered in Dubai, United Arab Emirates. It is a joint-venture between Al Ghurair and Tamil entrepreneur and philanthropist B.S. Abdur Rahman.

Company performance
Established in 1973, ETA Star Group is a private company headquartered in Dubai employing about 70,000 people in 23 countries with annual sales of US$6.5 billion. The ETA Star Group organization encompasses 140 entities and associate offices, with involvement in a number of verticals including automobiles, manufacturing, assembly, insurance, facility management, consumer electronics, real estate, contracting, engineering, aviation, hospitality, oil, natural gas, information technology, travel, leisure, trading, shipping and transportation.

Investments
ETA has invested in nearly 100 divisions including General, an air conditioning manufacturer, in India.

References

External links
ETA Star Group website
ETA Star Projects Website

Investment companies of the United Arab Emirates